Stupid Love is the fourth album by American singer-songwriter Mindy Smith, released in 2009 on Vanguard Records. The songs were written over a two-year period and the sound of the album moves away from country and closer to that of a pop record. Country artist Vince Gill provides harmony vocals on the track “Telescope” while Amy Grant adds vocals to "Couldn't Stand the Rain". Stupid Love was co-produced by Mindy along with Ian Fitchuk and Justin Loucks.

Reviews
The album has garnered mixed reviews from music critics, with a generally favourable reception.

Track listing
All songs written by Mindy Smith except where noted.

"What Went Wrong" – 3:24
"Highs and Lows" – 2:55
"If I Didn't Know Any Better" – 3:55 (Smith, John Scott Sherrill)
"Love Lost" – 4:14
"Telescope" – 3:03
"What Love Can Do" – 3:10
"Couldn't Stand the Rain" – 4:28
"Bad Guy" – 2:19 (Smith, Kate York, and Betsy Roo)
"Surface" – 3:57 (Smith, Susan Ashton)
"Disappointed" – 2:30
"True Love of Mine" – 4:29 (Smith, Daniel Tashian)
"Love Chases After Me" – 4:35 (Smith, Thad Cockrell)
"Take a Holiday" – 4:18 (Smith, Angelo Petraglia)
"Little Lies" – 4:17 (Christine McVie and Eddy Quintela) *iTunes Bonus Track

Personnel

 Mindy Smith – vocals, recorder, beer bottle, iPhone
 Justin Loucks – piano, keyboards, percussion, banjo, harmonica, drums, programming, yazoo growler
 Ian Fitchuk – guitar, vocals, drums, percussion, bass, piano, keyboards, iPhone, programming
 Daniel Tashian – guitar, vocals
 Court Clement – twelve–string guitar
 Neal Dahlgren – pedal steel guitar
 Kyle Ryan – electric guitar
 Lex Price – acoustic guitar
 Gary Burnett – acoustic guitar
 David Davidson – strings
 Matt Slocum – cello
 Vince Gill – vocals on "Telescope"
 Amy Grant – vocals on "Couldn't Stand the Rain"
 Leigh Nash – vocals on "What Love Can Do"
 Susan Ashton – vocals on "Surface"
 Thad Cockrell – backing vocals
 Kate York – backing vocals
 Betsy Roo – backing vocals
 Jeremy Lister – backing vocals and whistle
 Madi Diaz – backing vocals
 Peter Groenwald – backing vocals
 Mikky Ekko – backing vocals
 Micol Davis – tambourine
 Rachael Carlson – ice

Production
 Producer: Mindy Smith, Ian Fitchuck and Justin Loucks
 Engineer: Justin Loucks
 Mixing: Justin Loucks
 Mastering: Bob Boyd
 Cover art and Photography: Traci Goudie
 Package Layout: Carrie Smith

References

Mindy Smith albums
2009 albums
Vanguard Records albums